Makindu is a town in Makueni County, Kenya.

Location
The town is located on the Nairobi-Mombasa Highway, in Makueni County, in southeastern Kenya on the map, close to the International border with the Republic of Tanzania.

The geographic coordinates of Makindu are:2° 16' 30.00"S, 37° 49' 12.00"E (Latitude:-2.275000; 37.820000).

Overview
The settlement was established in the early 20th century, as a base for railway construction workers on the Mombasa-Kampala railway project. The Sikh Temple in Makindu that was built at that time, still bears reminiscence to the railway building days. The temple was a place of worship and social centre for many of the workers from India. The temple is well preserved and is managed as a free lodge for any traveller who knocks on its doors. Makindu is also served by Makindu Airport.

Climate

Population
The current population of the town of Makindu is not publicly known.

Points of interest
Makindu or its environs, is the location of the following points of interest:

 The offices of Makindu Town Council
 The offices of Makindu County
 The Shushan Palace Hotel – A boutique hotel located just off the Nairobi - Mombasa Highway
 Makindu Sikh Temple – Constructed in the early 20th century
 Makueni General Hospital – Owned and administered by the Kenya Ministry of Health
 Makindu Centre of Hope – A private hospital
 Makindu Post Office
 The Nairobi–Mombasa Highway – The highway passes through the middle of town in a northwest to southeast direction
 A branch of Kenya Commercial Bank – A private financial institution
 Makindu Airport – A public, civilian airfield
 Kenya Medical Training College
 Savanna Hotel
 Makindu Law Court
 Makindu Livestock Market on all Mondays

External links
Location of Makindu At Google Maps
History & Profile of Makindu Sikh Temple

See also
 Makindu Airport
 Makueni County
 Eastern Province (Kenya)
 Makindu Sikh Temple

References

Populated places in Makueni County